Super Sunday was a major professional wrestling supercard event promoted by the American Wrestling Association (AWA). The event featured Verne Gagne coming out of retirement in the main event, as well as Hulk Hogan challenging AWA World Champion Nick Bockwinkel for his title.  Rod Trongard handled commentary duties, while Mean Gene Okerlund was the ring announcer.  This event was added to the WWE Network in June 2016.

Background
The event was held at the St. Paul Civic Center in St. Paul, Minnesota on Sunday, April 24, 1983.

Results

See also
1983 in professional wrestling
AWA on television

References

1983 in professional wrestling
American Wrestling Association shows
Events in Saint Paul, Minnesota
Professional wrestling in Saint Paul, Minnesota